This is a list of current district-level leaders of Beijing, including Communist Party Committee Secretaries (labelled Party Secretary) and government leaders.

Party Secretaries

Governors

External links

Beijing-related lists